Live at the Ventura Theatre may refer to live DVDs by various bands:
Live at the Ventura Theatre (Switchfoot DVD)
Live at the Ventura Theater, by Something Corporate